As a German surname, Luther is derived from a Germanic personal name compounded from the words liut, "people", and heri, "army". As a rare English surname, it means lute player.  Luther is also derived from the Greek name Eleutherius. Eleutherius is a cognate of the Greek word eleutheros (έλεύθερος) which means "free". 

Origin and Meaning words of Luther

The name Luther is boy's name of German origin meaning army people. Once restricted to Evangelical Protestants honoring the ecclesiastical reformer and theologian Martin Luther, founder the Protestant Church.

Notable people
 Alan Harold Luther (born 1940), American theoretical physicist
 Bill Luther (born 1945), US congressman from Minnesota
 Bobbi Sue Luther (born 1978), American model and actress
 Cal Luther (1930–2021), American basketball coach
 Charles Luther (1885–1962), Swedish Olympic sprinter
 Charles Luther (soldier) (1880–1961), English soldier and cricketer
 Darlene Luther (1947–2002), American politician
 Frank Luther (1899–1980), American musician
 George Luther (1823–1884), American politician
 Hans Luther (1879–1962), German politician and Chancellor of Germany
 Harold C. Luther (1915–1973), New York politician
 John Luther (MP) (c. 1739–1786), English Member of Parliament
 Martin Christian Luther (1883–1963), was an Estonians entrepreneur and politician. He was a member of II Riigikogu. On 27 September 1923, he resigned his position and he was replaced by Max Bock.
 Martin Luther (diplomat) (1895–1945), German diplomat from 1940–1945 and a Nazi party member 
 Robert Luther (1822–1900), German astronomer (full name Karl Theodor Robert Luther)
  (1867/8–1945), German scientist (chemistry, photography)
 Sally Luther (1918–2015), Minnesota politician
 Sidney A. von Luther (1925–1985), American politician, New York state senator
 Thomas Luther (born 1969), German chess player

Arts, entertainment, and media
John Luther, protagonist in a British crime drama
Lex Luthor, a comic book villain
 Detective Chief Inspector John Luther, the protagonist of the British BBC television series Luther

See also
Luther (disambiguation)
Luther (given name)
Luter (surname)

References

Occupational surnames
Surnames from given names